Ministry of Social Affairs of the Republic of Indonesia (abbreviated as Kemensos, formerly Department of Social Affairs) is a ministry that has the task of organizing and overseeing domestic affairs in Indonesia to assist the president in implementing state governance in the social sector. The Ministry of Social Affairs is led by a Social Minister who since 23 December 2020 has been held by Tri Rismaharini.

History 
The first Minister of Social Affairs in the early days of independence was entrusted to Iwa Kusuma Sumantri. At that time, there were approximately 30 employees for the Labor and Social Affairs Departments. Initially, the Ministry of Social Affairs office was located at Jalan Cemara no. 5 Jakarta, but when the capital city of the Indonesian Republic was moved to Yogyakarta, on January 10, 1946, the Ministry of Social Affairs moved their headquarters to the seminary building on Jl. Code Yogyakarta. Then, when the Indonesian Government moved its capital back to Jakarta, the office of the Ministry of Social Affairs was re-established at Jalan Ir. Juanda 36, Central Jakarta, and has experienced a change of location again to Jalan Salemba Raya 28 Central Jakarta.

During the presidential reign of Abdurrahman Wahid, the Ministry of Social Affairs and the Ministry of Information were formally dissolved. At that time, Wahid had the idea that social welfare services were sufficient for the community in Indonesia. However, various social welfare problems occurred, such as natural disasters, social disasters, as well as a surge in the population of the homeless and neglected children in Indonesia. As a result, former high-ranking officials of the Ministry of Social Affairs at that time formed an agency that is responsible directly under the President, and thus, the National Social Welfare Agency (BKSN) was formed.

After the formation of the National Social Welfare Agency (BKSN), problems were not immediately resolved. In fact, BKSN was understaffed due to the imbalance of the population and social problems. With such considerations, in the National Unity Cabinet, the Ministry of Social Affairs was re-established, but with a merging with the Ministry of Health. Its nomenclature is the Ministry of Health and Social Welfare. The merging of those two ministries also did not provide an adequate solution to the social welfare problems, and the social problems have become increasingly complex. 

During the Gotong Royong Cabinet period, the Ministry of Social Affairs was re-functioned to carry out development tasks in the field of social welfare.

Tasks and functions 
The Ministry of Social Affairs has the task of carrying out affairs in the fields of social rehabilitation, social security, social empowerment, social protection and handling of the poor to assist the President in carrying out state governance. In carrying out its duties, the Ministry of Social Affairs carries out the functions as follows:
 Formulation, stipulation and implementation of policies in the fields of social rehabilitation, social security, social empowerment, social protection, and handling of the poor;
 Determination of criteria and data for the poor and needy people;
 Establishment of social rehabilitation standards;
 Coordinating the implementation of duties, coaching, and providing administrative support to all elements of the organization within the Ministry of Social Affairs;
 Management of State property / assets which is the responsibility of the Ministry of Social Affairs;
 Supervision of the implementation of tasks within the Ministry of Social Affairs;
 Implementation of technical guidance and supervision of the implementation of Ministry of Social affairs in the regions;
 Implementation of education and training, research and development of social welfare, and social counseling; and
 Implementation of substantive support to all organizational elements within the Ministry of Social Affairs.

Organizational structure 
Based on Presidential Regulation Number 46 of 2015, the Ministry of Social Affairs is organized as follows:

 Office of the Deputy Minister of Social Affairs
 Secretariat General
 Directorate General of Social Protection and Security
 Directorate General of Social Rehabilitation
 Directorate General of Social Empowerment
 Directorate General of Poor Management
 Inspectorate General
 Agency for Education, Research and Social Counseling
 Special Advisor on Change and Social Dynamics
 Special Advisor on Social Welfare Technology
 Special Advisor on Social Accessibility

List of ministers

Notes

References 

Government ministries of Indonesia
Social affairs ministries